The Ancient Art of War is a video game designed by Dave and Barry Murry, developed by Evryware, and published by Broderbund in 1984. It is recognized as one of the first real-time strategy or real-time tactics games.

Gameplay
A battlefield simulation, the game's title comes from the classic strategy text The Art of War written by Sun Tzu around 400 B.C.

The objective of the game is to win a series of battles using four types of troops: Knights, Archers, Barbarians, and Spies.  All four types are unmounted.

It uses a rock paper scissors type of unit balance typical of the genre. Knights beat barbarians in melee; barbarians have the advantage over archers; and archers have the advantage over knights, in addition to being effective at defending against attempts to storm a fort.  Spies do not fight, but they can see enemy units twice as far away as anyone else and are the fastest-moving units in the game.

At the start of the game, the player is able to select from a list of eleven campaigns to play. The campaigns include both skirmishes and capture the flags style missions, while the terrain layout and initial starting units provided a variety of strategic options for game play. Advanced rule sets such as Training New Units and  Supply Line Lengths allow for more customization.  The player can also select from among several Artificial Intelligence opponents represented by various historical figures such as Geronimo and Sun Tzu himself.  Sun Tzu represents the most difficult level.  These settings affected both AI behavior, as well as certain properties such as the speed at which enemy units moved through difficult terrain.

The game does not feature any economy management element (mining, gathering or construction), a common feature of later real-time strategy games.

Tactics
Each mission takes place on a map containing forts, towns, terrain features (bridges, mountains, forests, etc.), and squads. Squads can consist of up to 14 units, made up of any combination of the four unit types. A squad moves at the speed of its slowest unit (Barbarians are faster than Archers, which are faster than Knights), so a squad of all Barbarians would move faster than a mixed squad.

Squads that lose units have to make do until another squad can be merged with them. In many campaigns, squads with less than 14 units can receive random reinforcements by waiting at a fort.

When two enemy squads meet on the battlefield, they are frozen in an encounter while time continues to pass. If they are left by themselves, then after a delay, the computer will automatically determine the outcome of the battle. Alternately, the player can choose to "Zoom" into the battle to resolve it immediately, gaining limited command of the soldiers in battle. It may be advantageous to leave squads in an encounter while others squads run past the enemy squad so engaged. Formations can be chosen to take advantage of a squad's particular makeup. For example, all of a squad's Archers can be placed in the rear while the Barbarians form a line in the front. The game supported per-type orders during battle, so one could alternately place archers upfront with a gap; put knights within the gap; order the archers to fire while the knights hold; then order the archers to fall back while the knights attacked. One could not order individual soldiers, however.

Formations only affected the tactical battles; only whole squads were ever represented on the strategic map, not individual soldiers.

A number of factors influence the outcome of a battle, and elevate the game beyond a simple rock paper scissors strategy. Hunger, distance, terrain, and morale all affect the squads' effectiveness. Care has to be taken when marching troops full speed, or across a series of mountains, to prevent them from arriving at a battle too fatigued to fight. In addition, even the winning side in a battle suffered a slight reduction in the squad's readiness. Troops in very poor condition would fight poorly, might retreat without being ordered to do so, and would even potentially surrender outright if also significantly outnumbered. Hunger was modeled through an abstract 'supply' value per squad; villages and/or forts would slowly replenish the supplies of nearby friendly squads. A squad that was out of supply would lose condition and might be readily be destroyed by what would otherwise be an inferior force.

One of the limitations of the game engine was that it could only display a certain number of units total at any time. This lead some players to force the computer into having fewer (though stronger) units and thus easier to evade by creating an army of weak units.

Editing
The game allows players to create their own maps, formations, and missions.

The map editor provides a fixed palette of identically-sized tiles with a variety of terrain features, with which one can fill in the details on a fixed-size rectangular map.  The severity of certain terrain features, such as whether moving through mountains is merely slow or potentially deadly, is controlled at game time with options, not via a property of the map.

The formation editor allows the player to configure templates for arranging squads according to the three combat troop types; there are a fixed number of slots for formations, which can then be chosen in-game.

The campaign editor controls the positioning and composition of squads on both sides, their initial condition and supply levels, the location of flags, the default opponent, and the mission briefing, including settings such as how treacherous the terrain is.  Flags and squads must belong to one side or the other, as during the game.  The flags positions can be randomized; if either side does not have at least one flag assigned to them in a specific location, they receive a single randomly located flag when the mission was played.  This location changes every time the mission is restarted.

Development
The Ancient Art of War was designed by Dave and Barry Murry.  It was originally released for MS-DOS and Apple II in 1984, and was made available for Macintosh in 1987.

Reception
In 1985 Computer Gaming World praised The Ancient Art of War as a great war game, especially the ability to create custom scenarios, stating that for pre-gunpowder
warfare it "should allow you to recreate most engagements". In 1990 the magazine gave the game three out of five stars, and in 1993 two stars. Jerry Pournelle of BYTE named The Ancient Art of War his game of the month for February 1986, reporting that his sons "say (and I confirm from my own experience) is about the best strategic computer war game they've encountered ... Highly recommended."PC Magazine in 1988 called the game "educational and entertaining".

Legacy
The Ancient Art of War is generally recognized as one of the first real-time strategy or real-time tactics games, a genre which became hugely popular a decade later with Dune II and Warcraft. Those later games added an element of economic management, with mining or gathering, as well as construction and base management, to the purely military.

The Ancient Art of War is cited as a classic example of a video game that uses a rock-paper-scissors design with its three combat units, archer, knight, and barbarian, as a way to balance gameplay strategies.

GameSpy ranked The Ancient Art of War No. 10 in its greatest PC games of the 1980s.

It spawned two sequels, the naval-themed The Ancient Art of War at Sea (1987) and the World War I game The Ancient Art of War in the Skies (1993). A new version called The Ancient Art of War 2 is now available for PCs and mobile devices.

References

External links 
Official developer website
The Ancient Art of War at MobyGames

Review in Games International

1984 video games
Apple II games
Broderbund games
DOS games
Amstrad CPC games
Atari ST games
NEC PC-8801 games
NEC PC-9801 games
Classic Mac OS games
Real-time strategy video games
Video games developed in the United States
Single-player video games
Evryware games